Irawati Iskandar (born Irawati Moerid; 31 October 1969) is a former Indonesian tennis player.

She made her debut as a professional in August 1989, aged 19, at the Indonesia Open in Jakarta. She is also sometimes known by her maiden name, Irawati Moerid.

Together with partner Lukky Tedjamukti, she won the bronze medal in women's doubles at the 1990 Asian Games in Beijing.

She was part of Indonesia Fed Cup team in 1990, 1999 and 2000.

ITF finals

Singles (1–4)

Doubles (8–9)

References

External links
Note: WTA and ITF sites erroneously list Irawati Iskandar and Irawati Moerid as two separate players.

 
 
 
 

Indonesian female tennis players
1969 births
Living people
Asian Games medalists in tennis
Tennis players at the 1990 Asian Games
Tennis players at the 1998 Asian Games
Medalists at the 1990 Asian Games
Medalists at the 1998 Asian Games
Asian Games silver medalists for Indonesia
Asian Games bronze medalists for Indonesia
Southeast Asian Games gold medalists for Indonesia
Southeast Asian Games silver medalists for Indonesia
Southeast Asian Games bronze medalists for Indonesia
Southeast Asian Games medalists in tennis
Competitors at the 1991 Southeast Asian Games
20th-century Indonesian women
21st-century Indonesian women